Homer E. "Pete" Abele (November 21, 1916 – May 12, 2000) was an American politician from the Republican Party. He was active in Ohio politics, and represented the state in the House of Representatives.

Early life and education 
Homer "Pete" Abele graduated from Wellston High School in his birthplace of Wellston, Ohio in 1934. From 1935 to 1936, he served in the Civilian Conservation Corps. From 1938 to 1941, he lived in Lancaster, Ohio and McArthur, Ohio, working for the Anchor Hocking Glass Corp. and the Austin Powder Co.

In 1948, he earned a degree in pre-law from Ohio University in Athens, Ohio. In 1953, he received a law degree from Ohio State University in Columbus, Ohio.

Career 
In 1941, Abele joined the Ohio State Highway Patrol and worked as a state trooper from 1941 to 1946, except for a stint in the Army Air Corps from 1943 to 1946.

In 1949, while still a student in law school, Abele was elected to the Ohio House of Representatives, where he served from 1949 to 1952. In 1952, Abele joined the unsuccessful presidential campaign of Robert A. Taft.

From 1953 to 1957, Abele was a lobbyist for railroad interests. In 1956, he was appointed solicitor of the village of McArthur, Ohio. In 1952, Abele attended the Republican National Convention. In 1956, he was a delegate to the convention. From 1954 to 1957, Abele was the chairman of the Vinton County, Ohio, Republican Executive Committee.

In 1958, Abele was the Republican nominee for U.S. Representative from Ohio's 10th congressional district. He lost to incumbent Walter H. Moeller. Abele challenged Moeller again in 1962, and unseated him; he began his service in 1963 in the 88th United States Congress. Abele served only one term - in 1964, Moeller won the seat back from Abele.

In 1966, Abele was elected to the office of judge of the Ohio Court of Appeals for the Fourth District. He was re-elected in 1972, 1978, and 1984. He retired at the end of his fourth term in 1991. During his tenure, he was presiding judge from 1977 to 1978 and from 1983 to 1984. In 1978, Abele was chief justice of the Ohio Court of Appeals. Abele also occasionally sat as a visiting judge on the Ohio Supreme Court.

Abele remained a member of the Ohio State Highway Patrol Auxiliary, maintaining the rank of major. From 1967 to 1991, every graduating class of the State Highway Patrol Academy was administered its oath of office by Abele.

Personal life 
He died in Hamden, Ohio at age 83 after suffering from Alzheimer's disease.

Abele's son Peter B. Abele is currently a judge on the Fourth District Appeals Court.

See also
 List of United States representatives from Ohio

References

 

1916 births
2000 deaths
People from Wellston, Ohio
Deaths from Alzheimer's disease
Republican Party members of the Ohio House of Representatives
Ohio University alumni
Judges of the Ohio District Courts of Appeals
Ohio State University Moritz College of Law alumni
United States Army Air Forces soldiers
United States Army Air Forces personnel of World War II
Deaths from dementia in Ohio
American state police officers
20th-century American politicians
20th-century American judges
Ohio State Highway Patrol
People from Lancaster, Ohio
People from McArthur, Ohio
Civilian Conservation Corps people
Republican Party members of the United States House of Representatives from Ohio